Dancer's Lament is the first novel of the Path to Ascendancy trilogy by Canadian author Ian Cameron Esslemont. Set in the world of the Malazan Book of the Fallen, Dancer's Lament tells the story of the founding of the Malazan empire.

Development
In a 2016 interview with The Critical Dragon, Esslemont states he intended Dancer's Lament to be a potential new starting point in the Malazan world. He goes on to say he has plans for three novels in the Path to Ascendancy series, but "the door is open" for further books.

Plot
Dancer's Lament takes place before The Malazan Book of the Fallen. It tells the story of how Dancer and Kellanved meet and found the Malazan Empire.

Critical Reception
Dancer's Lament received mostly positive reviews.

Bill Capossere called it "a highly entertaining origin story" that was "streamlined, tightly-plotted and structured."

Fantasy Book Review gave it an 8 out of 10, calling it "a brilliant return to one of the most majestic and mystifying fantasy worlds ever to be created."

The Quill to Live gave it an 8.5 out of 10, calling it "good, probably even great" but noting it falls short "due to its lack of heavy hearted scenes."

References

2016 Canadian novels
High fantasy novels
Malazan Book of the Fallen
Bantam Books books
Tor Books books